Young Finns was a liberal political party in Finland founded in 1994 and abolished in 1999. In the 1995 parliamentary elections, the party gained two seats, held by Risto Penttilä and Jukka Tarkka. In the 1999 election Young Finns failed to get any seats and it was discontinued. Until 1997, the party was known as Young Finnish Party.

Before the 1999 election, Young Finns considered merging with the Liberal People's Party and drafts were signed but after the failure this was not continued.

Elections

External links
  
 Young Finns political program 1994 

Liberal parties in Finland
Political parties established in 1994
1994 establishments in Finland
Defunct political parties in Finland
Political parties disestablished in 1999
1999 disestablishments in Finland